Paviors Rugby Club is an English rugby union club based in Arnold, Nottinghamshire. The first XV team currently plays in Midlands Premier, having reached the national levels of the sport for the first time in 2019 following their victory in the 2018–19 promotion play-off match against the runner-up of Midlands 1 West.

Honours
 Midlands 3 East (North) champions: 2004–05
 Midlands 1 (east v west) play-off winners: 2018–19

References

External links
Official club website

English rugby union teams
Rugby union in Nottinghamshire
Sports clubs in England